Åkeshov is a station on the Green line of the Stockholm metro. It is located in the borough of Bromma in the west of the city of Stockholm. The station is at ground level, has two island platforms flanking three through tracks, and is one of the intermediate termini along the northern section of the Green line, with line 17 trains normally terminating. Access is by way of a pedestrian underpass that passes under both the metro line and the adjacent Bergslagsvägen street.

The station lies on the route of a line known as the  that formerly linked Alvik and Islandstorget. The Ängbybanan was designed and built for use by the future metro, but was operated from 1944 as part of line 11 of the Stockholm tramway. Åkeshov station was inaugurated as part of the metro on 26 October 1952 with the conversion of the Ängbybanan and its extension to form the metro line between Hötorget and Vällingby.

As part of Art in the Stockholm metro project, the station features a  bronze sculpture in the ticket hall symbolizing non-violence. The sculpture was created by Carl Fredrik Reuterswärd in 1998.

Gallery

References

Green line (Stockholm metro) stations
Railway stations opened in 1952